Maan Maryada is a 1991 Bengali film directed by Sukhen Das. The film has been music directed by Ajoy Das.

Cast
 Satabdi Roy
 Tapas Paul
 Samit Bhanja
 Utpal Dutta
 Subhendu Chatterjee
 Sukhen Das
 Koushik Bandyopadhyay

References

External links
 Maan Maryada at the Gomolo

Bengali-language Indian films
1991 films
1990s Bengali-language films
Films directed by Sukhen Das
Films scored by Ajoy Das